Crowley Lake is a reservoir on the upper Owens River in southern Mono County, California, in the United States.

The lake was created in 1941 by the building of the Long Valley Dam by the Los Angeles Department of Water and Power (DWP), as storage for the Los Angeles Aqueduct and for flood control. For more on the history of the lake, see Owens Lake.

It is known for its trout fishing. Between 6,000 and 10,000 anglers hit the lake on opening day. Crowley Lake Fish Camp, run in cooperation with the Los Angeles Department of Water and Power, is the only way to access the lake, and visitors can rent boats, book camping sites, and buy supplies at the Fish Camp.

The lake is named after Fr. John J. Crowley, "the desert Padre", who was a key figure in Owens Valley history and a local hero. When it became obvious that the city of Los Angeles's appropriation of the water supply had made agriculture impossible in the Owens Valley, many of the residents of the Valley lost all hope. Father Crowley traveled the Valley, convincing many of them that it could become a tourist destination. Father Crowley was killed in 1940 in an automobile accident.

Columns 
Some described them as stone cylinders connected by fortified stone arches that had been completely covered and obscured for millions of years but which had been gradually unmasked by the incessant pummeling of the lake's powerful waves, whose constant pounding had eroded the more malleable rock at the base of the cliffs encasing these pillars.

Formation 
The pillars were simply regarded as oddities until 2015 when geologists from UC Berkeley realized that they were the result of frigid water from melting snow seeping down into volcanic ash (the result of a catastrophic eruption more than 760,000 years prior), creating tiny holes in the hot ash, the byproduct being boiling water and steam, which then rose up and out of these same holes. Samples of the resulting "evenly spaced convection cells similar to heat pipes" were analyzed using X-rays and electron microscopes, with the UC Berkeley researchers finding that minute crevices in these "convection pipes" were bonded in place by minerals that were able to resist the erosion of the lake's waves. Others are warped or leaning at various angles, and others are half-submerged and, some say, resemble the petrified remains of dinosaur vertebrae.

See also
 List of lakes in California
 List of dams and reservoirs in California

References

External links
 
 Map of DWP assets in Long Valley (Largest lake is Crowley)

Reservoirs in Mono County, California
Dams in California
Los Angeles Aqueduct
United States local public utility dams
Reservoirs in California
Reservoirs in Northern California